Swachata Sanjiban Guha  or Swachhatoa Guha is an Indian actress from Kolkata, West Bengal now based in New Jersey, who made her Bollywood debut with  Lootera (2013).

Early life and background
Swachata Guha originates from Ichapore, West Bengal. Her father Sanjiban Guha is an actor in Bengali film industry. She holds a 1st class hons graduate in drama from the Rabindra Bharati University. and post graduate diploma in acting and film making from Film and Television Institute of India (FTII), Pune, graduating in 2011. She hails from a strong theatre background. she is currently married to Sudipta Mallik and settled in New Jersey.

Career
Also known as Shirin who has been a professional script-writer for Zee Bangla and journalist for ABP News. She is a trained dancer and made her Bollywood début with Hindi feature film Lootera (2013), directed by Vikramaditya Motwane. She has also appeared in "kabuliwala" in "Stories by Rabindranath Tagore" directed by Anurag Basu. Much talked short film " khane mein kya hain"   and the English play "GIANT". During the COVID-19 pandemic she appeared in the global cast of "the show must go online" YouTube live theatre show.

Filmography
 Light Shade Red (2012)
 Lootera (2013)
 " Jab Tum Kaho" (2016)
 " Tagore story" (2015) 
 "khane mein kya hain" (2017)
 "Giant" (2018-2019)
 "The show must go online" (2020)
 " The Marriage Proposal" (2021)

References 

 5. Swachata Sanjiban Guha-Be original, judge less & communicate more - Bollywoodirect
 6. Giant English Drama Play in Mumbai Tickets
 7. GIANT English Play/Drama - www.MumbaiTheatreGuide.com
 8.  
 9. Khaney main kya hai | Short Film of the Day | Shorted
 10. The Show Must Go Online Announce Full Cast For Livestreamed Reading Of KING LEAR
 11. The Show Must Go Online Announces Cast of Antony & Cleopatra - Theatre Weekly
 12. THE SHOW MUST GO ONLINE ANNOUNCE ALL GLOBAL MAJORITY CAST FOR LIVESTREAMED READING OF ANTONY & CLEOPATRA 
 13.  
 14. 
 15.

External links
 
 
 

Year of birth missing (living people)
Living people
Actresses from Kolkata
Indian film actresses
Actresses in Hindi cinema
Film and Television Institute of India alumni
Rabindra Bharati University alumni
People from North 24 Parganas district
21st-century Indian actresses